Zamostye is a rural locality (a khutor) in Bychkovskoye Rural Settlement, Petropavlovsky District, Voronezh Oblast, Russia. The population was 459 as of 2010. There are 11 streets.

Geography 
Zamostye is located 9 km southwest of Petropavlovka (the district's administrative centre) by road. Bychok is the nearest rural locality.

References 

Rural localities in Petropavlovsky District, Voronezh Oblast